Uyoyou Adia is a Nollywood actress and a film director. She is known for her roles in Charge and Bail, The Sessions and Hey You.

Career 
Adia started as an actress in 2013 where she featured in a film titled Child, Not Bride. In 2017, she did an intern with Tope Oshin and Remi Ibinola. After the intern, she got selected to participate in Homevida, a writing workshop powered by Homevida, Google, USAID and Pan-Atlantic University. Since then, she has written, directed and featured in several films.

Awards  and nominations 
She is a recipient of The African Films and Arts Festival Award Nomination under the category of Best Emerging Film Makers.

Filmography 

 Child Not Bride
 Nneka: The Pretty Serpent
 Rattlesnake: The Ahanna Story
 The Ghost and the Tout
 Charge and Bail
 The Sessions
 Hey You

References 

20th-century Nigerian actresses
21st-century Nigerian actresses
Nigerian film actresses
Nigerian women film directors
Nigerian women film producers
Year of birth missing (living people)
Living people
Nigerian film producers
Nigerian film directors
Nigerian screenwriters